The  was one of the government offices in Japan during the Meiji period (1868-1912).

Ths mission was found to be too socially divisive and it was abolished in 1872 and replaced with the Ministry of Religion which was presented as neutral between Shinto and Buddhism

See also 

 Proclamation of the Great Doctrine
 Great Teaching Institute
 Kyodo Shoku

References 

1872 disestablishments
Government agencies established in 1869
State Shinto
Defunct government agencies of Japan
Pages with unreviewed translations